Chelsey Minnis (born 1970 in Dallas, Texas)  is an American poet. Her collections of poetry include Zirconia, Bad Bad and Poemland. Zirconia won the 2001 Alberta Prize for Poetry. She received a B. A. in English from the University of Colorado Boulder and studied at the Iowa Writers' Workshop.

Minnis's work was described as expressing a "gurlesque" aesthetic by Arielle Greenberg, which she described as "a feminine, feminist incorporating of the grotesque and cruel with the spangled and dreamy."

Selected works
Zirconia. New York: Fence Books, 2001.
Foxina. Los Angeles: Seeing Eye Books, 2002.
Bad Bad. New York: Fence Books, 2007.
Poemland. Seattle: Wave Books, 2009.
Baby, I Don't Care. Seattle: Wave Books, 2018.

References

External links
Boston Review, Jan/Feb 2009; Review of Bad Bad
Small Press Distribution; author page for 'Poemland
Wave Books author page

1970 births
Living people
American women poets
21st-century American poets
21st-century American women writers